The Great Orchestra of Christmas Charity (GOCC, Polish Wielka Orkiestra Świątecznej Pomocy, WOŚP) is the biggest, non-governmental, non-profit, charity organization in Poland raising money for pediatric and elderly care. The GOCC Foundation holds American Heart Association certification to provide courses in CPR and AED, and for the use of high technology for medical lifesaving. The GOCC aims to support health care in Poland by purchase of state of the art medical equipment for Polish hospitals and clinics and by establishing and running six medical programmes and one educational programme. The foundation supports pediatric and geriatric wards, furnishing them in both complex medical devices such as MRI scanners, and providing long-term care units with anti-bedsore mattresses and beds.

Since April 2016 the GOCC ranks on the top of the list as the most trusted public entity according to Brand Asset Valuator and is the second strongest brand in Poland in the ranking compiled by Millward Brown and Young & Rubicam agency. The GOCC foundation organizes the biggest open-air free entry music festival in Europe – Pol'and'Rock Festival. The GOCC foundation offers first aid and team building courses, which are open to all adult members of public. The volunteers who have completed the training become the members of Peace Patrol, whose duties involve stewarding at the festival field, assisting and informing festival goers.

The charity has been the subject of smear campaigns by the ruling Law and Justice party, however, its fundraising tripled from 2015 to 2019. According to a survey by Gazeta Wyborcza it is the most-trusted Polish organization.

History 
The name The Great Orchestra of Christmas Charity was coined by Jerzy Owsiak in 1993. The charity was officially founded in 1993 by Jerzy Owsiak, Lidia Niedźwiedzka-Owsiak, Bohdan Maruszewski, and Piotr Burczyński. The main objective, at that time, was "Protecting Health and Saving Children's Lives by Providing Medical Equipment to Public Hospitals" (as stated in the deed of foundation). During the first Finale (which was organized for the benefit of paediatric cardiac-surgery) in the same year, the Foundation collected a total of USD 1,535,440.68. Subsequently, what was intended to be one-time fundraiser to aid Children's Memorial Health Institute in Warsaw became an annual public fundraiser held across the country. In 2004 the GOCC raised money for the victims of tsunami in Sri Lanka. In 2010, after southern Poland has been struck by flooding a special fundraiser was held in aid of flood relief.

Every year, millions of Poles donate to the Foundation and throughout 24 Grand Finales, the Foundation collected over $130 million for cardiac-surgery, neonatology, paediatric oncology, kidney diseases, congenital disorders, newborns and children under 5 years of age who have been victims of accidents . Since 2013 the GOCC has been raising funds to support geriatric and long-term care units in Poland.

During the 27th Grand Finale concert in Gdańsk on 13 January 2019, Mayor of Gdańsk Paweł Adamowicz was stabbed on stage. He died the following day after undergoing over five hours of surgery in a hospital. After Adamowicz's death, Jerzy Owsiak announced that he would be stepping down as the chairman of the GOCC.

A wave of support came from millions of people with the hashtag #MuremZaOwsiakiem trending (translated as #WeStandWithOwsiak) and hundreds of thousands of people signing a petition for Owsiak to remain the chairman of GOCC. Many pleas from celebrities, social activists, men of science, artists and religious activists have been sent to Owsiak, begging that he stays the chairman of GOCC. After the funeral of Paweł Adamowicz, Jerzy posted a video on his Facebook page saying that he was overwhelmed by the support and that he will not step down as the chairman of GOCC. He made a promise to Paweł Adamowicz that the Great Orchestra of Christmas Charity will be playing for eternity and one day longer.

The Grand Finale 
Since the 7th Grand Finale in 1999, the Grand Finale fundraiser has continuously taken place on the second Sunday of January, with the exception of the 9th, 25th, 29th and 30th Grand Finale in 2001, 2017, 2021 and 2022 respectively. The 29th Grand Finale in 2021 was post-poned by three weeks due to COVID-19. The day-long public fundraiser is held in Poland and everywhere where there is an active Polish community. The public fundraiser is organised locally, by volunteer-run Collection Centres, and is accompanied by various events such as concerts, sporting competitions, and firework displays. A telethon, broadcast nationally, is held on the day as well. Volunteers, carrying branded collection boxes collect money across the country, and people donating money receive distinct red-heart stickers in return. The day culminates with a firework display - known as Light to the Sky, which takes place in front of the Palace of Culture and Science in Warsaw. The funds are being raised during a public money collection, in online auctions, and personal and corporate donations.

Each Grand Finale has a specific medical objective, which is implemented by the foundation after consultations with medical professionals. In order to receive aid from the foundation, the hospitals apply for devices that achieve the stated objective. The equipment is bought by the foundation during an open tender.

Medical programmes 
The GOCC Foundation runs four medical programs and one educational programme. The programmes are in action all-year long and are introduced to hospitals and clinics nationwide, because the foundation aims to systematically improve public healthcare in Poland.  
 National Early Cancer Diagnostics in Children Programme - establishing a nationwide network of diagnostics centres aiming to detect cancer in children at an early stage. Another aim of the programme is to equip Poland’s key paediatric oncology wards with state of the art devices. The programme also includes awareness campaigns aimed at both doctors and parents.
 Universal Infant Hearing Screening Programme – free hearing tests of newborns in neonatology wards. The program is implemented in all wards across the country and allows to diagnose if a newborn child has any hearing defects and needs extensive tests to  subsequent hearing aids.
 The Retinopathy of Prematurity Prevention and Treatment Program – diagnosis and treatment of children whose retina has been damaged due to premature birth.
 Non-Invasive Breathing Support in Neonates Programme - “Infant Flow” – The program’s goal is to lower the number cases in which mechanical ventilation of premature babies and newborns is needed, because mechanical ventilation often leads to severe pulmonary complications.
 Programme for Personal Insulin Pump Treatment of Pregnant Diabetic Women - The program is aimed at purchasing insulin pumps which give pregnant women the chance for an active and an easier life with diabetes.
 National Program for Personal Insulin Pump Treatment of Diabetic Children - within the scope of this program purchases insulin pumps which give children a chance for an easier and more active life despite diabetes.

Educational programme 
The GOCC runs an educational programme known as 'We Save and Teach How to Save Lives' aimed at teaching children in primary schools the basis of CPR and first aid. Primary schools, which participate in the programme receive free teaching aids and the designated teachers are trained by certified AHA instructors.

References

Charity fundraisers
Health charities
Charities based in Poland
1993 establishments in Poland
Medical and health organisations based in Poland